Vasilyevka is a rural locality (a village) in Vokhtozhskoye Rural Settlement, Gryazovetsky District, Vologda Oblast, Russia. The population was 3 as of 2002.

Geography 
Vasilyevka is located 74 km east of Gryazovets (the district's administrative centre) by road. Putilovo is the nearest rural locality.

References 

Rural localities in Gryazovetsky District